Illocska,, is a village in Baranya county, Hungary. Residents are Magyars, with a minority of Serbs and Danube Swabians. Until the end of World War II, the majority of the inhabitants were Roman Catholic Danube Swabians (Schwowe), their ancestors once came in 1790 from Nagyszékely and Gyönk villages to Illocska. Most of the former German settlers were expelled to allied-occupied Germany and allied-occupied Austria in 1946–1948, as a result of the Potsdam Agreement.
Only a few Germans of Hungary live there, the majority today are the descendants of Hungarians from the Czechoslovak–Hungarian population exchange. They got the houses of the former Danube Swabians Inhabitants.

References

External links 
 Street map 

Populated places in Baranya County
Serb communities in Hungary